is a passenger railway station located in the city of Matsuyama, Ehime Prefecture, Japan. It is operated by JR Shikoku and has the station number "Y51".

Lines
Connections with other local or limited express trains are needed to travel further east or west along the line.

Layout
The station, which is unstaffed, consists of a side platform serving a single track. There is no station building, only a shelter for waiting passengers and a "tickets corner", a small shelter containing an automatic ticket vending machine. A ramp leads from the access road to the platform. A designated space for the parking of bicycles is provided behind the platform.

Adjacent stations

History
With the privatization of JNR on 1 April 1987, JR Shikoku assumed control and renamed it Kōyōdai Station.

Surrounding area
Japan National Route 196.

See also
 List of railway stations in Japan

References

External links
Station timetable

Railway stations in Ehime Prefecture
Railway stations in Japan opened in 1986
Railway stations in Matsuyama, Ehime